Karen Brady is a camogie player and student. She won a Soaring Star award in 2009 and won a 2009 All Ireland junior camogie medal. Karen also donned the number four jersey in Offaly’s narrow 2008 junior final defeat and was an Ashbourne Shield winner with U.L. in 2008. She won a Leinster Under-16 'B' championship with Offaly along with Under-12, Under-16 and Junior medals with her club.

References

External links 
 Official Camogie Website
 Offaly Camogie website
 Review of 2009 championship in On The Ball Official Camogie Magazine
 Video Highlights of 2009 All Ireland Junior Final
 Report of Offaly v Waterford 2009 All Ireland junior final in Irish Times Independent, Examiner and Offaly Express.
 Video highlights of 2009 championship Part One and part two

1989 births
Living people
Offaly camogie players